Richard Strozzi-Heckler (born in 1944) is an American author, coach, and consultant on "embodied leadership and mastery."

He is the founder of the Strozzi Institute, headquartered in Oakland, California.

Biography

Early life and education
Strozzi-Heckler spent his early life in a military family, periodically moving to different naval bases.  In early adolescence, he began studying martial arts, beginning with judo, then karate, and jiujitsu.  He excelled in athletics while in high school and was awarded a scholarship to San Diego State College in San Diego, California where he was named All-American in track and field.

After a Marine Corps tour of duty in the mid-1960s, Strozzi-Heckler traveled throughout Asia studying yoga and meditation. He returned to the United States, eventually earning a Ph.D. in clinical psychology from Saybrook University with an emphasis on mind-body connection.

Strozzi-Heckler holds the rank of seventh-degree black belt in Aikido. In January 2020, he was awarded Shihan by the International Aikido Headquarters in Tokyo, Japan.

Career
Strozzi-Heckler co-founded the Lomi School in 1970 with Robert K. Hall, Alyssa Hall, and Catherine Flaxman, integrating aikido and bodywork principles into a body-oriented psychotherapy called Lomi Work.

In 1976, Strozzi-Heckler, together with George Leonard and Wendy Palmer, established the Aikido of Tamalpais dojo in Mill Valley, California. In 1985, he was invited to contribute to a  US Army Special Forces project designed to test the effectiveness of integrating various practices into its training program.  During the six-month program, he taught aikido and meditation techniques.

In 1986, he moved to rural Sonoma County, California outside of Petaluma, and developed a methodology, Strozzi Somatics, aimed at reproducing the outcomes of the US Army project with individuals and civilian organizations. 

Strozzi Somatics has been employed in various forms to groups around the world and helped design and implement the Marine Corps Martial Arts Program.

Beliefs
Pointing out the relationship of thoughts and mood to an individual's body (e.g., posture, facial expression, tone of voice), Strozzi-Heckler has said that congruency between these elements and a person's words is a primary characteristic of effective leaders. He asserts that this characteristic can be practiced and improved as reliably as practicing and improving one's skill in a martial art or with a musical instrument.

The Strozzi Somatics methodology involves eliciting an individual or organization's defining values and introducing practices that combine conceptual understanding with physical activity in a way that is intended to produce an increase in behavioral traits that are in accordance with those values. Many of these practices are based on aikido movements or principles.

In addition to corporate and military leadership, Strozzi Somatics have been applied to law enforcement, corrections, professional and Olympic athletics, education, politics, social justice, and health.

Books
The Mind/Body Interface. Freeperson Press (1975) ASIN B0006YH3I2
Aikido and the New Warrior. North Atlantic Books (1993) 
In Search of the Warrior Spirit. North Atlantic Books (1997) 
The Anatomy of Change. North Atlantic Books (1997) 
Holding the Center. Frog Books (1997) 
Being Human At Work: Bringing Somatic Intelligence Into Your Professional Life. North Atlantic Books (2003) 
The Leadership Dojo. Frog Books (2007) 
The Art of Somatic Coaching: Embodying Skillful Action, Wisdom, and Compassion. North Atlantic Books (2014)

References

External links
  Strozzi Institute Website
 Two Rock Aikido Dojo
 
 The Great Lesson Web Archive of The Great Lesson: A New Film About Mind and Body: Featuring Richard Strozzi-Heckler

Saybrook University alumni
American aikidoka
Life coaches
American martial arts writers
21st-century American psychologists
1944 births
Living people
San Diego State University alumni
20th-century American psychologists